The 1991–92 NBA season was the 76ers 43rd season in the National Basketball Association, and 29th season in Philadelphia. During the off-season, the Sixers signed free agent Charles Shackleford. For the season, Charles Barkley changed his jersey number to #32 in honor of Magic Johnson, who retired due to HIV. However, the Sixers had retired that number in honor of Billy Cunningham, who un-retired it for Barkley to wear. After winning seven of their first ten games, the Sixers went on a 7-game losing streak, and held a 23–24 record at the All-Star break. Plagued by injuries all season, they missed the playoffs by finishing fifth in the Atlantic Division with a 35–47 record. Barkley was selected for the 1992 NBA All-Star Game, where Magic returned and won the All-Star MVP award.

Barkley averaged 23.1 points, 11.1 rebounds and 1.8 steals per game, while Hersey Hawkins averaged 19.0 points and 1.9 steals per game, and Armen Gilliam provided the team with 16.9 points and 8.1 rebounds per game. In addition, sixth man Ron Anderson averaged 13.7 points per game off the bench, while Johnny Dawkins contributed 12.0 points and 6.9 assists per game, and Manute Bol led the team with 2.9 blocks per game off the bench.

Making matters worse for the Sixers, Barkley had a falling out with management when they did not re-sign Rick Mahorn, who went overseas to play in Italy. When the season was over, he demanded a trade which the Sixers obliged sending him to the Phoenix Suns. Mahorn would later on sign as a free agent with the New Jersey Nets during the following off-season. Following the season, head coach Jim Lynam was fired.

For the season, the team changed their uniforms, adding the city name "Philadelphia" along with the team name "Sixers", plus adding stars to their jerseys. The uniforms remained in use until 1994.

Draft picks

Roster

Regular season

Season standings

y - clinched division title
x - clinched playoff spot

z - clinched division title
y - clinched division title
x - clinched playoff spot

Record vs. opponents

Player statistics

Awards and Records
Charles Barkley, All-NBA Second Team

See also
1991–92 NBA season

References

Philadelphia 76ers seasons
Philadelphia
Philadelphia
Philadelphia